David Oppegaard (born in Saint Paul, Minnesota, 19 August 1979) is an American novelist.

Biography 
Oppegaard's first novel, The Suicide Collectors, was published in 2008. It was nominated for the Bram Stoker Award for Best First Novel by the Horror Writers Association. Oppegaard has published several subsequent novels and young-adult books, including the 2016 Minnesota Book Award finalist The Firebug of Balrog County and The Town Built on Sorrow. 

Oppegaard's most recent novel is Claw Heart Mountain from CamCat Books (2023).

Oppegaard earned a Bachelor of Arts degree from Saint Olaf College in Northfield, Minnesota, and a Master of Fine Arts degree from Hamline University in Saint Paul, Minnesota.

Bibliography 
 2008 The Suicide Collectors
 2009 Wormwood, Nevada
 2012 The Ragged Mountains
 2014 And the Hills Opened Up
 2014 Breakneck Cove (novella)
 2015 The Firebug of Balrog County
 2017 The Town Built on Sorrow
 2023 Claw Heart Mountain

References

External links
David Oppegaard's website

21st-century American novelists
People from Blue Earth County, Minnesota
Novelists from Minnesota
Living people
American horror novelists
St. Olaf College alumni
Hamline University alumni
1979 births